Rabbi Baruch Dov Povarsky, often referred to as Rabbi Berel Povarsky, is the rosh yeshiva of the Ponevezh Yeshiva in Bnei Brak, Israel, alongside Rabbi Gershon Edelstein.

Biography 

Rabbi Povarsky was born in 1931 in Kletsk, the son of Rabbi Dovid and Chaya Tzipporah Povarsky. When he was three months old, the family moved to Baranovich where R' Dovid became a teacher in Yeshiva Ohel Torah-Baranovich and joined its affiliated kollel. During this period, Baruch Dov learned in the city's local cheder.  In 1941, escaping the Nazi-Soviet threats in Baranovich (then part of Poland), the Povarskys escaped to Vilnius, Lithuania together with thousands of other refugees. From there, they emigrated to Israel, where R' Dovid was soon appointed rosh yeshiva of the Ponevezh Yeshiva in Bnei Brak. In Israel, he learned in Yeshivas Ohr HaTalmud and Yeshivas Achei Temimim, and in 1943, for a short stint in the Chevron Yeshiva. However, shortly after becoming rosh yeshiva in Ponevezh, R' Dovid brought his son to learn there.

Rabbi Baruch Dov Povarsky began teaching in the Ponevezh Yeshiva in 1953, and after the death of the rosh yeshiva, Rabbi Elazar Menachem Man Shach, he became rosh yeshiva.

Works 

Bad Kodesh
Bad Kodesh al HaTorah
Shiurei HaGRaBaD Povarsky

References 

Rosh yeshivas
Israeli Rosh yeshivas
Ponevezh Rosh yeshivas
Israeli Orthodox rabbis
Haredi rabbis in Israel
1931 births
Living people
Rabbis in Bnei Brak